The 2006 FIFA World Cup qualification UEFA Group 3 was a UEFA qualifying group for the 2006 FIFA World Cup. The group comprised Estonia, Latvia, Liechtenstein, Luxembourg, Portugal, Russia and  Slovakia.

The group was won by Portugal, who qualified for the 2006 FIFA World Cup. The runners-up Slovakia entered the UEFA qualification play-offs.

Standings

Matches

Goalscorers
11 goals

 Pauleta

7 goals

 Andres Oper
 Cristiano Ronaldo

6 goals

 Róbert Vittek

5 goals

 Māris Verpakovskis
 Andrei Arshavin

4 goals

 Juris Laizāns
 Aleksandr Kerzhakov
 Dmitri Sychev
 Miroslav Karhan

3 goals

 Thomas Beck
 Franz Burgmeier
 Mario Frick
 Hélder Postiga
 Simão
 Marek Mintál
 Szilárd Németh
 Ľubomír Reiter

2 goals

 Ingemar Teever
 Kristen Viikmäe
 Vitālijs Astafjevs
 Imants Bleidelis
 Andrejs Prohorenkovs
 Mihails Zemļinskis
 Benjamin Fischer
 Petit
 Marat Izmailov
 Andrei Karyaka
 Dmitri Kirichenko
 Dmitri Loskov

1 goal

 Joel Lindpere
 Maksim Smirnov
 Andrei Stepanov
 Sergei Terehhov
 Fabio D'Elia
 Martin Stocklasa
 Gordon Braun
 Manuel Cardoni
 Alphonse Leweck
 Claude Reiter
 Jeff Strasser
 Jorge Andrade
 Ricardo Carvalho
 Deco
 Nuno Gomes
 Maniche
 Fernando Meira
 Hugo Viana
 Dmitri Bulykin
 Roman Pavlyuchenko
 Igor Demo
 Vratislav Greško
 Peter Hlinka
 Karol Kisel
 Radoslav Zabavník

1 owl goal

 Daniel Hasler (playing against Portugal)
 Ben Federspiel (playing against Portugal)
 Eric Hoffmann (playing against Latvia)
 Manuel Schauls (playing against Estonia)

See also 

3
2004 in Russian football
2005 in Russian football
2004 in Estonian football
2005 in Estonian football
2004 in Latvian football
2005 in Latvian football
2004–05 in Liechtenstein football
2005–06 in Liechtenstein football
2004–05 in Portuguese football
qual
2004–05 in Luxembourgian football
2005–06 in Luxembourgian football
2004–05 in Slovak football
2005–06 in Slovak football